The Indecent Displays (Control) Act is an Act of Parliament covering Scotland, England and Wales but not Northern Ireland. It is concerned with preventing the display of “indecent” material to the unsuspecting public. As with the Protection of Children Act, the Act does not define indecency, although it does give some directions as to how a display can be considered indecent. It establishes that “If any indecent matter is publicly displayed the person making the display and any person causing or permitting the display to be made shall be guilty of an offence”, making exceptions for the following:

material that is in a shop behind a warning notice (intended to protect sex shops for adults who wished to use them)
anything for a paying adult audience only
cinemas, theatres, and broadcasting, which are regulated separately
displays by “the Crown or any local authority”
museums and art galleries
the actual human body, which is again subject to other controls

The maximum sentence under the Act for making an indecent display is two years imprisonment. Various older pieces of legislation dealing with similar matters were repealed by the Act, but it was directed that other legislation in Scotland was to remain in force alongside it, including provisions that later became part of the Civic Government (Scotland) Act 1982.

Applicability
Prosecutions under the Act are rare. In response to a parliamentary question in 2006, it was revealed that proceedings in England and Wales in the years 2002-4 had run at three, six and two cases, with only three guilty verdicts, all in 2004. 

The type of material covered by the definition "indecent" could be any material that does not meet a standard of decency in English or Scots law, a category considerably lower than that of "obscenity", which makes material illegal to sell, even in private. Under one of the Act's predecessors, the album Never Mind the Bollocks, Here's the Sex Pistols was unsuccessfully prosecuted, and it has been displayed in shops ever since. In 2004, a nude sculpture was concealed from outside view after a warning about the Act. In the case of advertisements, such as the fcuk campaign, the Advertising Standards Authority deals with complaints on a self-regulatory basis.

References

External links

United Kingdom Acts of Parliament 1981